The 2008 Guernsey general election was held on 23 April 2008 to elect 45 members of the States of Guernsey. 18,576 voters or 40.58% of the eligible population of 45,772 turned out and cast a total of 89,239 votes; there were 10 blank papers, 35 spoilt papers and on average 4.8 votes were cast. Of the 28 standing deputies all but two (Brian de Jersey and Wendy Morgan), were re-elected to the house; this means that 19 of the Deputies-Elect are new to the chamber. Five of the 12 candidates who had stood unsuccessfully in 2004 were elected in 2008.

The candidate who polled the most votes was first time candidate Matt Fallaize standing in the Vale, who received 2,322 and became the youngest member of the house at 26.

Election Ordinance

On 1 May, Lyndon Trott was elected as Chief Minister of Guernsey by the newly elected deputies, with Bernard Flouquet as Deputy Chief Minister.

Results
Election results

Castel

South East

St Peter Port North

St Peter Port South

St Sampson

Vale

West

See also
 Politics of Guernsey
 Elections in Guernsey

References

External links

Guernsey
Elections in Guernsey
General election
April 2008 events in Europe